The Habicht-Cohn-Crow House is a historic house at 8th and Pine in Arkadelphia, Arkansas.  The single-story Greek Revival house was built in 1870 for Captain Anthony Habicht.  Habicht sold the house in 1875 to M. M. Cohn, the founder of the regional MM Cohn department store chain.  Cohn sold it five years later to A. M. Crow, a local land agent for the railroad.

The house was listed on the National Register of Historic Places in 1985.

See also
National Register of Historic Places listings in Clark County, Arkansas

References

Houses on the National Register of Historic Places in Arkansas
Greek Revival houses in Arkansas
Houses completed in 1870
Houses in Arkadelphia, Arkansas
National Register of Historic Places in Clark County, Arkansas